Suydam is a surname. Notable people with the surname include:

Arthur Suydam (born 1953), American comic book artist
James Augustus Suydam (1819–1865), American architect, lawyer and artist
Levi Suydam, American intersex property holder
Walter Lispenard Suydam (1854–1930), American real estate investor and socialite